Junction may refer to:

Arts and entertainment 
 Junction (film), a 2012 American film
 Jjunction, a 2002 Indian film
 Junction (album), a 1976 album by Andrew Cyrille
 Junction (EP), by Basement Jaxx, 2002
 Junction (manga), or Hot Tails
 Junction (video game), 1990
 Junction Theatre Company, in South Australia (1984–2002)
 Junction system, a feature of video game Final Fantasy VIII

Science and technology 
 Cell junction, a class of cellular structures in biology
 Electrical junction, a point or area where multiple conductors or semiconductors make physical contact
 Junction (hackathon), an event in Helsinki, Finland
 Junctions, a construct of Raku (programming language)

Transport 
 Junction (traffic), a location where traffic can change between different routes
 Road junction
 Junction (rail)
 Junction (canal)
 Junctions (software), a traffic simulation software package

Places in the United States

Junction, California, now Roseville
Junction, Idaho
Junction, Illinois
Junction, Ohio
Junction, Texas
Junction, Utah
Junction, West Virginia
Junction, Wisconsin

Other uses
 Junction (investment platform), an online investment tool

See also
 
 The Junction (disambiguation)
 Junction City (disambiguation)
 Junction station (disambiguation)
 Junction transistor (disambiguation)
 Grand Junction (disambiguation)
 Junction box, an enclosure housing electrical connections